

There are 576 properties and districts listed on the National Register of Historic Places in New York County, New York, which consists of Manhattan Island, the Marble Hill neighborhood on the mainland north of the Harlem River Ship Canal, and adjacent smaller islands around it. One listing (Riverside Park), appears on more than one of the lists described below.



Lists by area
National Register of Historic Places listings, by area, in Manhattan...

See also

New York City
 National Register of Historic Places listings in Kings County, New York (Brooklyn)
 National Register of Historic Places listings in Queens County, New York
 National Register of Historic Places listings in Richmond County, New York (Staten Island)
 National Register of Historic Places listings in Bronx County, New York
 List of New York City Designated Landmarks in Manhattan

New York State
 National Register of Historic Places listings in New York
 List of National Historic Landmarks in New York

References
Notes

Sources
National Register (Districts)
NY Landmarks

New York
 
Manhattan